WPVL-FM (107.1 MHz, "Xtreme 107.1") is a radio station  broadcasting a Top 40 (CHR) radio format Licensed to Platteville, Wisconsin, United States, it serves the Platteville, Wisconsin and Dubuque, Iowa areas.  The station is currently owned by Morgan Murphy Media. WPVL's main competition is KLYV "Y105".

History
The station went on the air as WSWW-FM. ("South West Wisconsin"). WSWW-AM and WSWW-FM were owned by Bob and Mary Bodden from 1955 to 1983. In 1983, the stations were sold to Edward Kramer of Kramer Broadcasting and the call letters were changed to WTOQ-AM and WKPL-FM. In 1995, the stations were sold to an investment group led by Paul Braun. On 1995-09-01, the station changed its call sign to the current WPVL-FM. In 1998, as part of a merger with radio stations WGLR-AM and FM in Lancaster, Wisconsin, the group of stations were bought by Morgan Murphy Media and became known as QueenB Radio.

Station programming
WPVL-FM mixes local hosts with syndicated programming throughout the broadcast day. Weekend hours contain a mix of local voice-tracking and syndicated shows. WPVL-FM is Dubuque and southwest Wisconsin's home for the syndicated program On-Air with Ryan Seacrest, which airs weekdays from Noon to 4pm. Xtreme 107.1 also carries the syndicated American Top 40 on Weekends.

References

External links
Official website

Morgan Murphy Media stations
PVL-FM
Contemporary hit radio stations in the United States